Several ships and shore establishments of the Royal Australian Navy have been named HMAS Platypus, after the platypus:
, the former HMVS Cerberus.
, a submarine depot ship built for the Royal Navy as HMS Penguin in 1917, transferred to the RAN in 1919 and scrapped in 1958.
, a submarine shore base on Sydney Harbour between 1967 and 1999.

Battle honours
Ships named HMAS Platypus are entitled to carry a single battle honour:
Darwin 1942–43

References

Royal Australian Navy ship names